Braddock Road is an island-platformed Washington Metro station in Alexandria, Virginia, United States. The station was opened on December 17, 1983, and is operated by the Washington Metropolitan Area Transit Authority (WMATA). Providing service for both the Blue and Yellow Lines, the station is located at Braddock Road and West Street.

History
Originally scheduled to open in summer 1982, its opening was delayed because of both unavailability of new subway cars and the lack of a test track. Construction of the station was complete by summer 1982, and in September 1983 Metro announced the station would open that December as the new cars would be ready for service. The station opened on December 17, 1983.

In 2012, a Capital Bikeshare station was installed across the street as part of Alexandria's initial bikeshare expansion and another station was added closer to the entrance in early 2022.

In 2014, the Metroway Bus Rapid Transit system began service with Braddock Road station serving as the southern terminus.

In May 2018, Metro announced an extensive renovation of platforms at twenty stations across the system. The Blue and Yellow Lines south of Ronald Reagan Washington National Airport station, including the Braddock Road station, would be closed from May to September 2019, during which the platforms at this station would be rebuilt.

Between September 10 and November 5, 2022, Braddock Road was closed due to the Potomac Yard station tie-in, closing all stations south of Ronald Reagan Washington National Airport station. Shuttle buses were provided throughout the shutdown.

Station layout 
Access to the island platform is provided by one pair of escalators and one elevator. West of the platform are the three tracks of the RF&P Subdivision, which carry Amtrak and Virginia Railway Express trains, while east of the platform there are bus bays serving DASH and Metrobus and a small metered parking lot.

References

External links 
 

 The Schumin Web Transit Center: Braddock Road Station
 Station from Google Maps Street View

Stations on the Blue Line (Washington Metro)
Washington Metro stations in Virginia
Stations on the Yellow Line (Washington Metro)
Railway stations in the United States opened in 1983
Transportation in Alexandria, Virginia
1983 establishments in Virginia